Toroi is a traditional  Māori dish, made from mussels and a leaf vegetable, usually pūha or watercress. The ingredients are cooked together in mussel broth and stored in jars, preserved by undergoing fermentation by bacteria. Toroi can also seasoned with ingredients such as chilli and garlic during the fermentation process.

See also 

 Kimchi
 Knieperkohl
 List of pickled foods
 Sauerkraut

References 

Māori cuisine
Pickles